Adoration is a 2008 Canadian drama film directed by Atom Egoyan and starring Rachel Blanchard, Scott Speedman and Devon Bostick.

The film was first shown at the 2008 Cannes Film Festival, where it won the Prize of the Ecumenical Jury and was nominated for the Palme d'Or. Adoration won "Best Canadian Feature Film – Special Jury Citation" at the 2008 Toronto International Film Festival. The film had its U.S. premiere in April 2009 at the San Francisco International Film Festival, and went into U.S. release on May 8, 2009.

Plot
High school French teacher Sabine reads to her class as a translation exercise a French newspaper report of a terrorist who planted a bomb in the airline luggage of his pregnant girlfriend. If the bomb had detonated, it would have killed her, her unborn child, and many others, but it was discovered in time by Israeli security personnel.  Egoyan based the story partly on the 1986 Hindawi affair.

In the course of translating, Simon, who lives with his maternal uncle Tom, imagines that the news item is his own family's story: that his Palestinian father Sami was the terrorist, the woman was his mother Rachel, an accomplished violinist, and he was her unborn child. Years ago, Sami crashed the family car, killing both himself and Rachel, making Simon an orphan. Influenced by his maternal grandfather, Morris. who disliked Sami, Simon has always feared that the crash was not an accident but intentional.

Sabine asks him to develop the story as a drama exercise, to read it to the class, and for dramatic effect to pretend that it really happened. He does so, and discussions evolve on the Internet about the story. Sabine is fired for making Simon lie.

Tom, who is a tow truck driver, tows Sabine's car away. Sabine follows him in a taxi, and by mobile phone she offers him a meal in a restaurant. Later she reveals to him that she had been married to Sami for 5 years, until Sami met Rachel.

Cast

Production
The Internet discussion sessions featured in the film were edited from a two- to four-hour improvised group discussion undertaken on the Internet by several of Egoyan's friends and fellow artists.

Reception
The film received mostly positive reviews. On review aggregator Rotten Tomatoes, Adoration has a score of 63% based on 102 critics, with an average rating of 6.1/10, the critical consensus stating, "A complex and thought-provoking work, Atom Egoyan's Adoration works well as both mystery and engaging drama." On Metacritic, the film has a score of 64 out of 100, based on 20 reviews.

References

External links
 
 
 
 

2008 films
2008 drama films
Canadian drama films
English-language Canadian films
Films directed by Atom Egoyan
Films scored by Mychael Danna
Films about educators
Films about orphans
Films about terrorism
Sony Pictures Classics films
Films about social media
Films shot in Toronto
2000s English-language films
2000s Canadian films